Alber may refer to the following people:
Given name
Alber Elbaz (1961–2021), Moroccan-Israeli fashion designer 
Alber Gonsalves, Indian football midfielder 
Alber Saber (born c. 1985), Egyptian blogger

Surname
Arthur Alber (1892–1964), American attorney and member of the Los Angeles City Council 
Frederick Alber (1838–1913), soldier in the American Civil War
Jonas Alber (born 1969), German conductor and violinist
Karl Alber (born 1948), German football player
Laura J. Alber (born 1968), American businesswoman 
Matt Alber (born 1975), American singer-songwriter, filmmaker and youth advocate 
Reinhard Alber (born 1964), German cyclist

Masculine given names
German-language surnames